Florian Le Roy (8 May 1901 – 6 March 1959) was a 20th-century French journalist and writer.

During the Second World War, he worked as presenter for Radio Rennes Bretagne.

Selected publications 
1927: Bonne sœur des chemins, prize of the Société des gens de lettres
1935: Guénolé
1937: Pays de Bretagne, prix du tourisme Breton
1944: Vieux métiers bretons, illustrations by Mathurin Méheut, reprint 2011, 
1946: L'Oiseau volage, Prix Cazes 1947
1948: En passant par la Bretagne, illustrations by Pierre Péron and Xavier de Langlais
1948: Bretagne des Saints, illustrations by 
1950: La seconde mort, Éditions de Flore - 
 Les Côtes de Bretagne, illustrations by Pierre Le Trividic, Éditions H. Defontaine
 Le Péché d'être heureux, novel, in the monthly literary review Les œuvres libres, volume 169

See also 
 Seiz Breur

20th-century French writers
Writers from Brittany
20th-century French journalists
1901 births
People from Côtes-d'Armor
1959 deaths